Hong Kong '97 is a 1994 American political action thriller film directed by Albert Pyun starring Robert Patrick, Brion James and Tim Thomerson. The story revolves around the transfer of sovereignty over Hong Kong from the United Kingdom to the People's Republic of China. An assassin kills several high-ranking Chinese officials and must get out of the country quickly before he himself is murdered.

The movie was released directly to video on November 9, 1994.

Plot 
On June 30, 1997, assassin Reginald "Reg" Cameron enters a club and assassinates a high ranking People's Liberation Army officer, General Wu. Fearing revenge against him, several friends and colleagues urge him to flee Hong Kong.  To add to the troubles, at midnight, the Chinese army will begin to enter the city as British rule expires on July 1.  He must escape to avoid any further attempts on his life.

After escaping multiple assassination attempts against himself, his colleagues Simon and Jack drop him off at a safe house, Chun's Martial Arts School for the time being while they attempt to find out who is trying to kill him.  Chun's is owned by Reg's ex-girlfriend Katie and her grandfather Master Chun.  Katie reveals to Reg that her grandfather defected from Red China during the Cold War and will be wanted once Chinese rule goes into effect by the government.  They plan to flee on a flight to Malaysia just before midnight.  While Master Chun is delighted to Reg again but Katie eagerly dismisses him when Simon calls with information about his would-be assassins.

On his way to meet Simon and Jack, more would-be assassins attempt to kill Reg.  He is intercepted by Simon and Jack in a car where they explain that Triad gangs are attempting to kill him due to the high price put on his head for his earlier assassination.  Knowing he must finally flee, he decides to meet with Katie and Master Chun for their flight to Malaysia.  On the way he explains why he is such a successful assassin.  He does not care about anything caught in collateral damage as he had to witness his parents being murdered in India when he was 11 years old.

At the airport, Reg prepares to part ways from Simon and Jack by giving his guns to Jack, whom the latter had no idea he was an assassin at first.  However, as Chun, Katie and Reg are about to board the plane, more assassins converge on the airstrip.  Jack decides to finally use a gun and starts shooting at the assassins, killing some.  However, he eventually is shot and killed, which Reg witnesses and deeply affects him.  While fleeing the airport on a motorboat, Chun is shot in the arm.  Reg's protégé and lover, Li, arrives at the port to assist in their escape.  However, she is killed and her death affects Reg even more than Jack's death.  Knowing they need medical attention, they stop at a Chinese checkpoint as troops are rolling in from the mainland for assistance.  Katie is skeptical due to Chun being a defector but reluctantly accepts help from the guards.  Chun receives treatment for his wounds and tells the others to meet him at Kennedy Port in the morning.

They eventually travel to Reg and Simon's company to call off the hit on Reg's head so it will be easier for them to flee the country.  Going through a shootout to the main computer, they are able to mark Reg as being dead and the bounty collected by Simon.  But before they can escape, a colleague of Reg and Simon, Malcolm Goodchild, appears and reveals that it was he who placed the bounty on Reg, knowing that he would be labeled as a national hero for killing an assassin of a Chinese General.  Reg and Malcolm fight on an elevator and as Malcolm gains the upper hand, the door opens and Katie shoots Malcolm.

That morning, the four escape Hong Kong via boat from Kennedy Port along with Chun, who meets them there as promised.

Cast 
 Robert Patrick as Reginald Cameron
 Brion James as Simon Alexander
 Tim Thomerson as Jack McGraw
 Ming-Na Wen as Katie Chun
 Selena Chau-yuet You as Li
 Michael Lee as Chun
 Andrew Divoff as Malcolm Goodchild

Reception 
Hong Kong '97 attracted mixed reviews, and currently has a Rotten Tomatoes public rating of 53%.

See also 
 List of films set in Hong Kong
 Hong Kong 97 (video game)

References

External links 
 

1994 films
American action thriller films
1994 action thriller films
1990s chase films
American chase films
Films set in 1997
Films set in Hong Kong
Films shot in Hong Kong
Films directed by Albert Pyun
Films set in the future
Trimark Pictures films
1990s English-language films
1990s American films